Erwin Smith may refer to:

Erwin E. Smith (1886–1947), American photographer 
Erwin Frink Smith (1854–1927), American plant pathologist 
Erwin Smith (Attack on Titan), a character in the manga and anime series